MOAC may refer to:

 Mid-Ohio Athletic Conference, an athletic league for high schools in Ohio, US
 Ministry of Agriculture and Cooperatives (Thailand) 
 Cyclic pyranopterin monophosphate synthase, an enzyme
 American Legend MOAC, an American aircraft design